Ambrotius Olsen Lindvig (30 September 1855 – 9 May 1946) was the Norwegian Minister of Trade 1912–1913.

1855 births
1946 deaths
Government ministers of Norway
Ministers of Trade and Shipping of Norway